"You Better Know It" is a 1959 single by recorded and written by Jackie Wilson who collaborated with Brunswick Records staff songwriter Norm Henry.   Although the single made the Top 40, it was not as successful as Jackie Wilson's previous entries, peaking at number thirty-seven.  On the R&B chart, the single was Jackie Wilson's, second number one, where it stayed for one week.

"You Better Know It" was used in the 1959 film Go Johnny Go, which starred Jackie Wilson and Alan Freed.

References

Jackie Wilson songs
1959 songs
1959 singles
Songs written for films